Teymur Mammadov (born 11 January 1993) is a heavyweight amateur boxer from Azerbaijan. He won a bronze medal at the 2012 Olympics and reached quarterfinals at the 2016 Games, where he served as the flag bearer for Azerbaijan during the Parade of Nations.

Career
Mammadov won silver at the 2011 World Amateur Boxing Championships, losing to Oleksandr Usyk and gold at the 2011 European Amateur Boxing Championships. At the London 2012 Olympic Games Mammadov won a bronze medal after a controversial decision to award him a victory over Siarhei Karneyeu. He had already defeated Jai Opetaia but lost to Clemente Russo in the semi-final.

In 2013 Mammadov reached the finals at the 2013 European Amateur Boxing Championships in Minsk and won the silver medal. He won a bronze medal at the 2013 AIBA World Boxing Championships after losing to Clemente Russo again.

By 2015 Mammadov moved down from the heavyweight (91 kg) to light heavyweight division (81 kg), winning a gold medal at the 2015 European Games. At the 2016 Summer Olympics, he was defeated in the quarterfinals by the eventual silver medalist Adilbek Niyazymbetov of Kazakhstan. Mammadov was the flag bearer for Azerbaijan during the Parade of Nations.

References

External links

 
 
 
 Euro 2011 at amateur-boxing.strefa.pl
 World Championships 2011 results at amateur-boxing.strefa.pl

Azerbaijani male boxers
Heavyweight boxers
1993 births
Living people
Boxers at the 2012 Summer Olympics
Boxers at the 2016 Summer Olympics
Olympic boxers of Azerbaijan
Olympic bronze medalists for Azerbaijan
Olympic medalists in boxing
Medalists at the 2012 Summer Olympics
Boxers at the 2015 European Games
European Games gold medalists for Azerbaijan
European Games medalists in boxing
AIBA World Boxing Championships medalists
Sportspeople from Baku
Islamic Solidarity Games medalists in boxing